Ilex kaushue is a species of plant in the holly family, Aquifoliaceae, which is used to make a very bitter tea called kuding.

References

kaushue
Endemic flora of China
Herbal tea